Nicholas Brendon Schultz (born April 12, 1971), known professionally as Nicholas Brendon, is an American actor and writer. He is best known for playing Xander Harris in the television series Buffy the Vampire Slayer (1997–2003) and Kevin Lynch in Criminal Minds (2007–2014).

Brendon played Xander Harris for seven years and appeared in all but one of 144 episodes. For his role as Xander, Brendon was nominated for a Saturn Award in 1998 and 1999 for Best Genre TV Actor and in 2000 for Best Supporting Actor. He continues to regularly attend comic conventions and sci-fi conventions. He has been involved in development of Xander's character in follow-up comic books, and has been credited as a writer for several issues.

Although Brendon has continued to work as an actor, with regular recurring parts in TV series and starring roles in limited release films such as Coherence and Big Gay Love, his struggles with substance misuse and depression have overshadowed his professional career. Brendon has attracted public attention for his multiple arrests and convictions on a variety of charges since 2010.

Early life 
Nicholas Brendon was born Nicholas Brendon Schultz on April 12, 1971 in Los Angeles, three minutes after his identical twin brother, Kelly Donovan. He was born the second of four boys, with two younger brothers.

As a child, he aspired to become a professional baseball player, but he "lost the passion for it" at 20. Instead, he decided to pursue acting to help manage his stutter, which had first become apparent at age seven or eight, and had made him so fearful of speaking or interacting with strangers that he did not begin dating until 21 or 22. Brendon comments, "Every day I still have to remind myself to slow down and concentrate. Constant repetition of tongue-twisters was like lifting weights for me, but patience and persistence have paid off." Brendon has done work for the Stuttering Foundation of America, which approached him around 2001, and made him its honorary chairperson for its National Stuttering Awareness Week in May 2001.

He gave up acting after two years because he "couldn't stand the politics in Hollywood". Brendon returned to school to study medicine, which didn't work out; he also tried his hand at a variety of odd jobs, including plumber's assistant, veterinary janitor, day care counselor, waiter, and production assistant for the television show Dave's World.

Career

Breakout role as Xander Harris

At the age of 25, Brendon had hit "rock bottom": his girlfriend had left him, he was working as a waiter and could barely afford his rent, and had almost given up on getting good work. After buying the wrong kind of Pop Tarts for his co-workers, his boss fired him and told him "You should be acting." Brendon was attracted to the pilot script for Buffy because of how much he had hated high school. Brendon recognised that Xander was based on Joss Whedon when he had attended high school, accounting for why Xander "gets all the good lines". He signed with a manager and obtained the role of Xander Harris on Buffy the Vampire Slayer three months later.

Buffy Summers (played by Sarah Michelle Gellar) is the "Slayer", one in a long line of young women chosen by fate to battle evil forces. This mystical calling grants her the powers of dramatically increased physical strength, endurance, agility, accelerated healing, intuition, and a limited degree of precognition. In contrast, Brendon's character, Xander is the only character without supernatural abilities, and provides comic relief and a grounded perspective. It is Xander who often provides the heart to the series, and in season six, becomes the hero in place of Buffy who defeats the "Big Bad". Buffy and Willow are the only characters who appear in all 144 episodes; Xander is missing in only one.

Brendon shared the screen with his twin, Kelly Donovan, when his character was split in two in the fifth-season episode "The Replacement".

For his role as Xander, Brendon was nominated for Saturn Award in 1998 and 1999 for Best Genre TV Actor and in 2000 for the Supporting Actor.  

In 2014, Brendon was part of a summit for writers of Buffy the Vampire Slayer comics, which included Joss Whedon, Jane Espenson, Drew Greenberg, Andrew Chambliss and the then-incoming Buffy writer Christos Gage. He was involved with the show's canonical comic book series, Buffy the Vampire Slayer Season Ten, on stories centering on his character.

Brendon continues to be a regular fixture at comic conventions and sci-fi fan conventions, and has streamed videos of himself reading fanfiction starring his character Xander Harris on his Facebook page.

After Buffy the Vampire Slayer

After the series ended in 2003, Brendon joined the cast of the Fox television pilot The Pool at Maddy Breakers. The series was not picked up by the network. In 2004, he co-starred in his first ABC Family movie, Celeste in the City. The following year, he returned to Fox as part of the cast of Kitchen Confidential, based on the book by chef Anthony Bourdain. Thirteen episodes were made, but the series was canceled on December 9 of the same year after the fourth episode aired, due to low ratings.

In 2006, he voiced Huntsboy #89 for season 2 of the animated series American Dragon: Jake Long. That same year, he reunited with his former Buffy the Vampire Slayer co-star Charisma Carpenter in the ABC Family TV movie Relative Chaos.

From July 26 through August 30, 2006, Brendon co-starred with Noah Wyle in the play Lobster Alice at the Blank Theatre Company in Los Angeles. He subsequently appeared in the Blank Theatre's annual Young Playwrights Festival and its productions of The SantaLand Diaries (November 20 to December 20, 2009), and Why Torture Is Wrong, and the People Who Love Them.

In 2007, Brendon began appearing on the TV series Criminal Minds in the recurring role of FBI technical analyst Kevin Lynch. He appeared in episodes in each subsequent season through the tenth season.

In late 2010, he premiered his web comic Very Bad Koalas, co-created with animation director/producer Steve Loter. The comic follows the journey of two sheltered and innocent koalas experiencing a variety of people and places while on the run from the law in a 1958 Cadillac El Dorado.

Also in 2010, Brendon began a four-episode arc on ABC's Private Practice playing Lee McHenry, a mentally disturbed man who assaults Charlotte King.

Brendon had a recurring role in Untitled Web Series About a Space Traveler Who Can Also Travel Through Time along with Sylvester McCoy, Robert Picardo, Mayim Bialik, Chase Masterson, Rosearik Rikki Simons, Carrie Keranen.

Personal life 

Brendon was married to actress Tressa DiFiglia from 2001 to 2006.

He enjoys painting and photography and has sold his own original artwork. Brendon started to tour gallery shows of his artwork in 2019.  He released a "Fall Art Collection" in 2020.

Brendon has struggled for many years with depression and alcoholism, leading to many run-ins with the law and multiple arrests and several convictions for destruction of property, vandalism, theft and domestic violence. At a Buffy fan convention in Cleveland, Ohio, in 2004, he announced that he had voluntarily entered rehab for alcoholism.<ref>{{cite news |author=Susman, Gary |title=Buffy'''s Xander checks himself into rehab |date=June 20, 2011 |url=http://www.ew.com/ew/article/0,,631412,00.html |newspaper=Entertainment Weekly}}</ref>

In 2010, Brendon was tased and arrested by Los Angeles police, who confronted him in response to a call about an intoxicated individual. He allegedly swung his fists at the officers and attempted to run away, and was arrested for felony vandalism. Brendon was later charged with four misdemeanors, including one count of resisting arrest, two counts of battery against a police officer, and one count of vandalism. In May 2010, he again checked himself into rehab to address his addiction to alcohol and sleeping pills. Brendon pleaded no contest to all four charges in June 2010 and received a one-year suspended jail sentence, was placed on probation for 36 months, and was required to perform 10 days of community service.

While participating in the Tree City Comic Con, Brendon was arrested on October 17, 2014 in a Boise, Idaho hotel lobby for misdemeanor charges of malicious injury to property and resisting or obstructing officers. Brendon subsequently made a public apology and stated that the incident was "embarrassing" and the result of drinking alcohol while taking pain medication for a knee problem.

Brendon married Moonda Tee in Las Vegas in 2014, one week after proposing. Brendon announced their separation via social media five months later in February, 2015. Tee claimed in a video posted to social media that this was because Brendon had cheated on her.

Brendon was arrested on suspicion of grand theft by Fort Lauderdale police in February 2015 after he reportedly trashed his hotel room and refused to pay the bill. He had been in Fort Lauderdale for a local comic convention. His spokesman released a statement shortly after the incident: "Nicholas is, unfortunately, battling a disease that many of us don't understand. ... he's sorry for his actions. ... we are aware that Nicholas' actions are of a much deeper origin—and we are working toward creating a healthy environment for him to thrive in. The past several months have been trying, and Nicholas' disease is damaging and consistently misunderstood. We are doing everything in our power at camp Nick to assure his recovery." Brendon was arrested again for destroying another hotel room after demanding an upgrade. In an interview the next day, he blamed his behaviour on a recent change in medication and said he would see a doctor to have it reviewed. Due to his arrest, Brendon missed the first day of the ALT*Con conference, apologising to fans.

Brendon appeared on Dr. Phil to discuss his recent arrests and alcoholism in August 2015. However, he walked off the show soon after the interview began. Brendon later explained on his Facebook page that he had been drinking before the interview and had felt unprepared to "lay [out] the darkest parts of myself on national TV". Brendon returned to Dr. Phil'' in December that year to discuss his arrests and mental health struggles, including several suicide attempts.

Brendon was arrested in Saratoga Springs, New York in October 2015 for choking his girlfriend in a hotel room. He was charged with felony third-degree robbery, criminal mischief and obstruction of breathing. He pleaded guilty to criminal mischief, a misdemeanor. As part of his plea deal, Brendon avoided a custodial sentence if he completed drug and alcohol counselling and one year of probation. Brendon subsequently entered a rehab facility in California for a 90-day residential treatment program.

Brendon was arrested for assaulting another girlfriend at a hotel bar in Palm Springs, California in October 2017. He was charged with felony corporal injury to a spouse 
in April 2019 and pleaded not guilty a month later. Brendon subsequently agreed to a plea deal to avoid a potential four-year prison sentence for felony domestic violence and violation of active protective orders issued by two states, in which Brendon was allowed to be near the woman, but prohibited him from harassing, threatening, injuring or assaulting her. On February 28, 2020, he was sentenced to three years' probation and 20 hours of community service, and was required to complete a 52-week domestic violence course.

On February 15, 2021, Brendon revealed on Instagram that he was in the hospital undergoing a spinal surgery after slipping earlier that month. Several days later, during a Facebook Live stream from his hospital room, Brendon addressed the allegation that his former co-star Charisma Carpenter made against Joss Whedon, stating that “I love and support [her] very much and I know that story, and it’s not a kind story,” further stating that although he “love[s] both Carpenter and Whedon," he acknowledged that his relationship with Whedon hadn't been entirely friendly, ultimately saying that it was "kinda hard to give a statement" given his relationship with the people involved.

Brendon was arrested in Terre Haute, Indiana in August 2021 for failure to identify and obtaining a prescription by fraud. He was pulled over while driving erratically and police found bags with crystal residue powder in them. A search by K9 dogs found secret compartments cut out of the floor of the car, and more bags with residue powder. This arrest is a violation of his current probation for domestic assault.

Filmography

Film

Television

Video games and web series

Awards and nominations

References

External links 

Official Website

1971 births
American comics writers
American male television actors
American male voice actors
Identical twin male actors
Living people
Male actors from Los Angeles
American twins
20th-century American male actors
21st-century American male actors
American male film actors